Blanche Hillyard defeated Edith Austin 6–1, 6–1 in the all comers' final to win the ladies' singles tennis title at the 1894 Wimbledon Championships. The reigning champion Lottie Dod did not defend her title.

Draw

All Comers'

References

External links

Ladies' Singles
Wimbledon Championship by year – Women's singles
Wimbledon Championships - Singles
Wimbledon Championships - Singles